John Arnold Kronstadt (born March 5, 1951) is a Senior United States district judge of the United States District Court for the Central District of California.

Early life and education
Kronstadt was born in 1951. He graduated from Cornell University in 1973 with an Artium Baccalaureus At Cornell, he was a member of the Quill and Dagger society. He earned his Juris Doctor from Yale Law School in 1976. After completing law school, Kronstadt served as a law clerk for Judge William P. Gray of the United States District Court for the Central District of California.

Judicial service

State judicial service 

In October 2002, governor Gray Davis appointed Kronstadt to the Los Angeles County Superior Court. He replaced Judge Juelann Cathey, who had retired earlier that year following major heart surgery.

While a superior court judge, Kronstadt presided over the case to determine rightful ownership of the Bahia Emerald, an 840-pound gemstone that has previously been valued at $372 million. During his state judicial service, only one of Kronstadt's decisions was reversed.

Federal judicial service 

On November 17, 2010, President Barack Obama nominated Kronstadt to a judgeship on the United States District Court for the Central District of California to a seat vacated by Judge Florence-Marie Cooper, who died on January 15, 2010. On April 12, 2011, the Senate confirmed his nomination by a 96–0 vote. Kronstadt received his judicial commission two days later. He assumed senior status on April 1, 2022.

Personal
Kronstadt is married to California 2nd District Court of Appeal Justice Helen Bendix.

References

External links

1951 births
Living people
Cornell University alumni
Judges of the United States District Court for the Central District of California
Superior court judges in the United States
United States district court judges appointed by Barack Obama
21st-century American judges
Yale Law School alumni